The International Forum on Energy Security for the Future: New Sources, Responsibility, Sustainability (ESF) is an initiative on energy security focused on popularization of alternative energy sources in Europe and worldwide. Founded by the Prince Albert II of Monaco Foundation, Aleksander Kwaśniewski's Foundation "Amicus Europae" and Ukraine's leading private oil & gas producer Burisma in 2016. The founders of the Forum are Prince Albert II of Monaco, Nikolay Zlochevskyi and Aleksander Kwaśniewski. The Head of the Organizing Committee of the Forum is Vadym Pozharskyi from Burisma.
The Forum offers an exclusive discussion platform to address energy security matters and supports an equal and open dialogue between states, governments, business people, expert community and civil society about the transition to a green economy and renewable energy sources.

History and background 
First held on June 2, 2016, in Monte Carlo, Monaco, the Forum on Energy Security for the Future: New sources, Responsibility, Sustainability promotes non-polluting renewable energy. It calls for close cooperation and coordination among countries, organizations and civil society to address common security challenges and energy concerns.

With more than 150 guests in attendance, including European politicians, energy experts, journalists and owners of Europe's largest energy companies, the Forum has already gained recognition as the most ambitious European project on energy security issues and promotion of alternative energy sources.

"This is such a unique occasion, when a Forum managed to bring together different people of different social status to address European energy security. Organized by the Prince Albert II of Monaco Foundation and Burisma Group, the Forum doesn't only attempt to attract socially responsible businesses and civil society over the idea of energy security, it also offers an exclusive discussion platform that allows participants to share their thoughts and lay foundation for a comprehensive long-term strategy of energy security in Europe", admitted co-founder of the Forum and the President of Burisma Group Nikolay Zlochevskyi.

The Forum was opened by Prince Albert II of Monaco. In his speech he focused on the need to develop alternative energy sources and outlined that the topic of the Forum was “essential” for a secure and prosperous future of European states. 
“Energy security planning has to be done in a long-term perspective,” the Prince noted. “We should pay more attention to renewable energy sources that would enable getting cheap energy without polluting the environment.”

Organized by Burisma Group in partnership with the Adam Smith Conferences, and with support from the Prince Albert II of Monaco Foundation and the Aleksander Kwaśniewski's Foundation Amicus Europae, the Second International Forum on Energy Security for the Future: New vision, Strategy, Innovation took place on June 2, 2017 in Monte Carlo, Monaco. The event addressed Europe’s energy security with focus on Ukraine’s increasing role in the European energy market.

“This event goes in line with our corporate objectives, but most importantly, it reflects values and principles that we, at Burisma Group, stand by: integrity, social responsibility and innovation. We are proud that the Forum is becoming Europe’s largest energy platform. Every year, more and more politicians and public figures join in to aid the cause. With the support from the Prince Albert II of Monaco Foundation, we are hoping that our Forum will bring tangible results for the entire Europe”, admitted the head of the organizing committee and advisor to the board of directors at Burisma Group Vadym Pozharskyi..

The third annual Forum on ENERGY SECURITY FOR THE FUTURE will take place on June 1, 2018 in Monte Carlo, Monaco. The Forum will address revolutionary thinking necessary to strengthen energy security and latest innovative accomplishments in the energy sector.

Forum participants and topics

Forum 2016 
The Forum speakers induced such high-European politicians as Aleksander Kwaśniewski (President of Poland 1995-2005), Joschka Fischer (Vice-Chancellor of Germany 1998-2005), Andris Piebalgs (EU Commissioner for Energy, 2004 and 2009), TJ Glautier (US Vice-Secretary of Energy 1999-2001, President of TJG Energy Associates), Hunter Biden (Independent director of Burisma), Ireneusz Bil (Director of Amicus Europae, the Foundation of Aleksander Kwaśniewski), Jean-Arnold Vinois (European Commission representative on Energy Policy issues) and other honored guests.

The attendees discussed the following topics:
 Alter-Eco: New energy for the "New" Europe
 Energy Sources: Geopolitics and Diversification
 A Necessary Balance: Environmental security and corporate responsibility The Next Steps: An Alternative Energy Road Map and Public-private partnerships

The first Energy Security Forum also became a platform for presentation of the English version of Mission Ukraine written by the Polish author Maciej Olchawa. The book reflects the vision of the European Community and Ukraine’s place in it and reveals new interesting details of the Cox-Kwasniewski Mission, which played the key role during the Revolution of Dignity in Ukraine.

In his book Maciej Olchawa talks about European integration, Ukraine’s place in Europe and the world, modern leaders and new political elites formation. The book also suggests a new strategy of the EU international politics from the perspective of Ukrainian events. Aleksander Kwaśniewski presented the book Mission Ukraine, together with the author they held an autograph session and promised to publish a Ukrainian version of the book.

Forum 2017 
For the second year in a row, the Forum on Energy Security for the Future: new vision, strategy, innovation brought together over 250 guests including global leaders, politicians, energy experts and journalists. The Forum started with welcoming remarks from Prince Albert II of Monaco, followed by keynote addresses from the President of Slovenia (2007–2012) Danilo Türk and the Prime Minister of Belgium (1999–2008) and the Leader of the Alliance of Liberals and Democrats for Europe Group Guy Verhofstadt.

The panelists of the keynote session included the Vice Prime Minister of Ukraine Volodymyr Kistion, the Director of the CIA’s Counterterrorist Center (1999-2002) and Ambassador at Large for Counter-Terrorism (2002-2004) Joseph Cofer Black, the European Commissioner for Energy (2004 and 2009) Andris Piebalgs, and the Director of the Atlantic Council Dina Patriciu Eurasia Center and the US Ambassador to Ukraine (2003-2006) John E. Herbst. They focused on the role of institutions in strengthening European energy security.

The first session closed with a keynote presentation from the President of Poland (1995-2005) Alexander Kwasniewski. The analytical market debate, moderated by the EU Platts correspondent Siobhan Hall, placed special emphasis on latest trends affecting the European energy market, including energy landscape changes, supply and demand dynamics and competition. The Forum addressed European energy security at a regional level and development of energy-efficient infrastructure.

In attendance from the Ukrainian side were the Vice Prime Minister of Ukraine Volodymyr Kistion, the Head of the Committee on Taxation and Customs Policy at the Verkhovna Rada of Ukraine Nina Yuzhanina, Deputy Minister for International Integration at the Ministry of Energy and Coal Industry of Ukraine Nataliya Boyko, as well as representatives of the Embassy of Ukraine in France, the Cabinet of Ministers, Ministries and Departments.

“The processes taking place in the EU automatically affect Ukraine and vice versa. Such events allow Ukrainian and European leaders share their views and define instruments required to obtain energy independence at a country level and in the whole Europe”, noted the President of Burisma Group Nikolay Zlochevsky.

Forum 2018 
On June 1, 2018, in Monte Carlo (Principality of Monaco); organized by the largest gas-extracting company of Ukraine Burisma Group, the 3rd International Forum on Energy Security in Europe - Energy Security for the Future was held with the partnership of the Prince Albert II of Monaco Foundation. The Alexander Kwasniewski Foundation, Amicus Europae, and Atlantic Council also became partners of the Forum. The third forum from the European event turned into a global event in the field of energy and environmental security. This year the Forum was attended by about 250 people, representing more than 20 countries.

The event was informally called the "Forum of Presidents", which brought together political leaders of European countries, among which are Prince Albert II of Monaco; President of Latvia Raymonds Vejonis, former President of Poland (1995-2005) Alexander Kwasniewski; President of the European Commission and Prime Minister of Italy Romano Prodi; President of the European Council and Prime Minister of the Czech Republic Mirek Topolanek and Bernard Fortier, Vice-President of Prince Albert II of Monaco Foundation. Discussions of the Forum were attended by Mark Pritchard, the member of the UK Parliament and leader of the delegation to OSCE; U.S. politician and senior senator from the state of Louisiana, Mary Loretta Landrieu; the Latvian politician and the diplomat, the commissioner of the European Union on power and development Andris Piebalgs; Ambassador Extraordinary and Plenipotentiary and Director of the Dinu Patriciu Eurasia Center of the Atlantic Council, John Edward Herbst and others.

The vector of revolutionary thinking, changes and the introduction of new technologies became the topic of the Forum 2018 Economic relations, energy, and politics are undergoing one of the most ambitious changes in history. The economic activity of the world leaders changes the generally accepted views on doing business, ideology, and model of life activity.

Energy Security for the Future 2018, Monaco

According to the founder of the Forum on Energy Security for the Future and the President of Burisma Group - Nikolai Zlochevskyi, For the last three years, the Energy Security for the Future forum has acquired the status of the largest public, political, economic and innovation movement aimed at bringing together all politicians and people around the formation of a single, secure European alliance. “Only consolidation can effectively promote the new innovative formats of clean energy sources in the lives of Europeans. Taking into account interdependence and global challenges, only a strong, energetically independent Europe can guarantee a future for its peoples. Ukraine is already an important strategic link in the overall system of energy security in Europe", - Nikolai Zlochevskyi said.

Partners 

Since its creation in 2016, the Forum on Energy Security for the Future has established partnerships with a diverse range of stakeholders and international organizations interested in accelerating renewable energy deployment and introduction of latest technologies. These alliances reflect a commitment to long-term promotion of renewable energy around the world.

To advance its mission, the Forum is closely working with the Aleksander Kwaśniewski's foundation "Amicus Europae" on the development of the European Neighborhood Policy, with a special focus on Ukraine and Belarus and fostering the transatlantic dialogue and future of Europe debates.

"The topic of this forum is very important, as energy is a key factor not just today -- it will also remain a key factor in the future," Kwaśniewski said. "The modern world is changing faster than ever. I hope that Burisma will continue to support such initiatives".

In 2017, the British professional team Adam Smith Conferences became official partners of the Forum, transforming event into a truly global conference. As the 2016 Forum, the 2017 Forum was supported by The Prince Albert II of Monaco Foundation, Aleksander Kwaśniewski's Foundation Amicus Europae and other high-profile organizations.

The Forum is also actively working with the Electric Marathon.

References 

Energy security